My Own Wolf: A New Approach to Ulver is a tribute album to the Norwegian band Ulver. It features twenty-six different artists from around the world covering material from almost every Ulver release, ranging from the demo Vargnatt up through the album Blood Inside.

Releases 
The album was released for free download on December 25, 2007. In 2008, the album was released on CD by German label Cold Dimensions.

Track list

Latter CD digipak version of the tribute, released by Cold Dimensions, contains quite different version of the "Lost in Moments" cover and tracks "Tomorrow Never Knows" and "Ulver" are swapped.

Credits
Oleg Paschenko – cover art
Ivan 'Fever' (head of Aspherical Asphyxia) – management, mixing of tracks 4 and 10 on disc 2, final mastering

References

External links
Official site, with download mirrors
Release page at the Discogs.com

 

2007 compilation albums
Tribute albums
Ulver albums